The Radio Club Argentino (RCA) (in English, literally Argentine Radio Club) is a national non-profit organization for amateur radio enthusiasts in Argentina.  RCA was founded in Buenos Aires on October 21, 1921.  Key membership benefits in the organization include the use of a QSL bureau for those amateur radio operators in regular contact with amateur radio operators in other countries, a group insurance policy, and a quarterly membership journal called Revista del Radio Club Argentino.  The Radio Club Argentino represents the interests of Argentine amateur radio operators before Argentine and international regulatory authorities.  It is also the national member society representing Argentina in the International Amateur Radio Union.

See also 
International Amateur Radio Union

References 

Argentina
Non-profit organisations based in Argentina
Organizations established in 1921
1921 establishments in Argentina
Radio in Argentina